Shiv Prasad gautam

S.P.G. (1911–1970) was an Indian novelist, playwright, columnist, poet and satirist. His texts "Ehi Thaiyan Jhulni Herani ho Rama!" also printed in NCERT Book.

Personal life
Shiv Prasad Mishra Rudra was born into a family of priests in Varanasi Uttar Pradesh. His father Pandit Mahaveer Prasad Mishra and mother Sumitra Devi looked at him as Lord Shiva's grace, hence gave him the name.

Education and career
After his schooling at Harishchandra and Queens Colleges, Varanasi, he went to study at Banaras Hindu University from where he obtained his BA, MA and PhD degrees. He had a long and varied teaching career. The various organizations and institutions that he was associated are: City Basic School, Varanasi, and then Mirzapur etc.; Aj daily newspaper, Harishchandra College, Varanasi etc. In the last phase of his career, in 1959, he became a part of the Department of Hindi in Banaras Hindu University.

Legacy
Bahti Ganga, first published in 1952, is his epochal work. It's a series of historical stories centered on the city of Varanasi covering that span in the history of Varanasi  from mid eighteenth century to mid twentieth century.

Works
 Bhasha ki Shiksha, critical work
 Mahakavi Kalidas, play
 Dashshvamedh, play
 Bahti Ganga, short story collection/novel
 Suchitap, novel
 Anthologies of Poems: Ghazalika, Tal Talaiya, Tulsidas, Album.

References

1911 births
1970 deaths
Indian male novelists
Indian male dramatists and playwrights
Indian male poets
Indian satirists
Writers from Varanasi
Academic staff of Banaras Hindu University
20th-century Indian poets